"Slow Burn" is the fourth and final single from Atreyu's fourth album Lead Sails Paper Anchor. Due to "Doomsday" only being released in the UK, it is known as their third US single.

Music video
Atreyu held a contest on YouTube, for the winner to star in the "Slow Burn" music Video. The terms of the contest were that you must lipsync part 1, 2, or 3 of the song. The Contest began on June 27, 2008, and ended on July 13, 2008.

Chart performance
The single has so far peaked at #16 on the Hot Mainstream Rock Tracks and #16 on the Hot Modern Rock Tracks. This is their fourth single to chart on the Billboard Mainstream rock chart, and third to chart on Billboard Modern rock chart.

References

Atreyu (band) songs
Hollywood Records singles
2008 singles
2007 songs
Song recordings produced by John Feldmann